Vaan may refer to:

People
 Laura de Vaan (born 1980), Dutch paralympian
 Michiel de Vaan (born 1973), Dutch linguist
 Vaan Nguyen (born 1982), Israeli poet

Places
 Vaan River, India

Other
 Vaan (Final Fantasy)
 Vaan (film)